Mmabatho Stadium is a multi-purpose stadium in Mafikeng, South Africa.  It is currently used mostly for football matches.  The stadium holds 59,000 people and was designed and built in 1981 by an Israeli construction firm.

The design of the stadium is almost identical to that of the Odi Stadium located in Mabopane.

References

Soccer venues in South Africa
Athletics (track and field) venues in South Africa
Multi-purpose stadiums in South Africa
Mahikeng
Sports venues in North West (South African province)
1981 establishments in South Africa
Sports venues completed in 1981